Kim Eun-jung is the common Roman-alphabet spelling of two different Korean names.

Also spelled Kim Eun-jeong:
Kim Eun-jung (curler) (born 1990), South Korean curler
Kim Eun-jung (singer), South Korean singer, member of Jewelry
Kim Eun-jeong (swimmer) (born 1973), South Korean swimmer
Kim Un-jong (gymnast), North Korean gymnast, represented North Korea at the 2004 Summer Olympics
Kim Eun-jung (football coach), coach of the South Korea women's national football team
Eun Jung Kim (parameterized complexity), South Korean computer scientist and mathematician working in France

Also spelled Kim Eun-joong:
Kim Eun-jung (footballer) (born 1979), South Korean football player
Kim Eun-jung (writer) (born 1972), South Korean children's writer

See also
Kim Jung-eun (born 1976), South Korean actress